Corris Craft Centre is a craft and leisure complex in Corris, on the A487 near Machynlleth, mid-Wales.  It is sometimes referred to as King Arthur's Labyrinth, one of the attractions on the site. Celebrating 40 years in 2022.

The craft workshops
Winter opening is limited, The Cafe, Welsh Deli and a few studios open Wednesdays to Sundays until 18 December. The centre, which opened in 1982, comprises 9 workshops, with resident craftspeople:

 Quarry Pottery - Home of the Smoking Dragon
 Agau Jewellery Studio - Celtic and Contemporary Jewellery
 The Candle Studio - Dipped and Carved Candles
 Chocablock - Handmade Chocolates, Truffles and Fudge
 Delyn Glass - Flamework and Glass Sculptures
 Taran Eco Designs - Funky Rustic Forest Furniture
 Hyde and Sheep- Handmade Leather and Woolen Gifts 
 Dyfi Distillery - Craft Gin with Wild Welsh Botanicals
 Sammi Wilson Art - Mixed Media Artwork and Photography

Some of the studios also offer hands-on sessions, for visitors to have a go at making their own crafts, such as painting pottery, making chocolates, and dipping candles.

Braichgoch Slate Mine

The centre is built on a landscaped part of the old Braichgoch Slate Mine, and the presence of these underground workings has presented the opportunity for other related attractions at the Craft Centre site, for which a charge is made :

 King Arthur's Labyrinth is an underground storytelling adventure, where visitors sail underground through vast caverns and winding tunnels, and through a waterfall to the past.  Hear tales of King Arthur and other ancient Welsh legends are told with dramatic scenes, light and sound. It takes place on one level of the mine. The King Arthur's Labyrinth shop sells a wide range of books, gifts and souvenirs on the Celtic Arthurian theme.
Lost Legends of The Stone Circle is a further attraction where visitors find mythical stories, intriguing characters and The Stone Circle whilst navigating the snaking paths of a simple maze. It's suitable for all ages and can be explored at leisure with a pushchair, and also by wheelchair users.
 Corris Mine Explorers is the name of another activity which starts from the Craft Centre.  This provides an opportunity to explore the abandoned workings of  Braichgoch Slate Mine, an old Welsh slate mine, first worked in 1836 but abandoned by the miners in the early 1970s. Equipment and discarded personal belongings remain untouched as relics of Welsh industry.

Food and drink
The Craft Centre cafe serves a delicious all day menu where locally sourced fresh produce is used across the menu.  As part of the centre's 30th Anniversary, a new Welsh food and drink shop was opened adjacent to the café, called The Welsh Deli 

There is a children's play area, next to outdoor seating and picnic tables.

Opening hours
All of the Craft Centre Studios open daily from Easter to November, although some are open all year round. Access to the site is free.

Y Crochan café and Bwtri Y Crochan are open daily from Easter to the end of October. Opening times vary at other times of the year.

Corris Mine Explorers is open all year round, although during particularly quiet times, trips may only run if there is sufficient demand.

King Arthur's Labyrinth and Lost Legends of The Stone Circle open every day during the season.

See also
 Studio craft
 Braichgoch Slate Mine
 Slate industry in Wales

References

External links
 Corris Craft Centre
 King Arthur's Labyrinth
 Corris Mine Explorers

Corris
Slate mines in Gwynedd
Tourism in Gwynedd
Tourist attractions in Wales